Coleophora cuprariella is a moth of the family Coleophoridae. It is found on the Dodecanese Islands and Turkey.

The length of the forewings is 5–6 mm. Adults are on wing in April.

References

cuprariella
Moths described in 1846
Moths of Europe
Moths of Asia